The Kansas Department of Commerce is a department of the government of Kansas under the Governor of Kansas. As the state's lead economic development agency, it is responsible for business recruitment and expansion, as well as workforce development. The head of the Department is the Secretary of Commerce, who is appointed by the Governor, with the approval of the Kansas Senate.

Leadership
The Department is led by the Secretary of Commerce. Under Governor Laura Kelly, David Toland is currently serving as the secretary.

Organization
Secretary of Commerce
 Deputy Secretary, Business and Community Development Division
 Business Recruitment
 Business and Technical Assistance
 Business Finance
 Training Services
Creative Arts Industries Commission
 Deputy Secretary, Workforce Services Division
 America's Job Link Alliance
 Employment Services and Local Areas
 Training Services
 Workforce Training and Education Services
 Information Technology
 Chief Fiscal Officer, Fiscal Division
 Chief Legal Counsel, Legal and Regulatory Division
 Human Resources
 Kansas Athletic Commission
 Building Services
 Regulatory Compliance
 Executive Director, Governor's Council of Economic Advisors
 Marketing and Communications Director
 Executive Director of Business and Education Innovation

References

External links 
 Official Website
Kansas Department of Commerce publications online at KGI Online Library

Commerce, Department of
State departments of commerce of the United States